Digambara Sādhu (also muni, sādhu) is a Sādhu in the Digambar tradition of Jainism, and as such an occupant of the highest limb of the four-fold sangha. They are also called Nirgranth which means "one without any bonds". Digambar Sādhus have 28 primary attributes which includes observance of the five supreme vows of ahimsa (non-injury), truth, non-thieving, celibacy and non-possession. A Digambar Sādhu is allowed to keep only a feather whisk, a water gourd and scripture with him.

In Jainism, those śrāvakas (householders) who wish to attain moksha (liberation) renounce all possessions and become an ascetic. According to the Jain text, Dravyasamgraha: 

Digambar Sādhus are also called nirgranth which means "one without any bonds". The term originally applied to those of them who were on the point of attaining to omniscience, on the attainment of which they were called munis.

Rishabhanath (the first Tirthankar) is said to be the first Digambar  Sādhu of the present half cycle of time (avasarpini). The presence of gymnosophists (naked philosophers) in Greek records as early as the fourth century BC, supports the claim of the Digambars that they have preserved the ancient Śramaṇa practice. Āchārya Bhadrabāhu, Āchārya Kundakunda are two of the most revered Digambar Sādhus.

Mūla Guņas (Root virtues) 

Every Digambara monk is required to observe 28 mula gunas (lit. twenty-eight primary attributes) compulsory. These are also called root-virtues, because it is said that in their absence other saintly virtues cannot be acquired. They are thus like the root, in the absence of which stems and branches tuneless come into being. These twenty-eight primary attributes are: five supreme vows (mahāvrata); five regulations (samiti); five-fold control of the senses (pañcendriya nirodha); six essential duties  (Şadāvaśyaka); and seven rules or restrictions (niyama).

Mahavratas 

According to Acharya Samantabhadra’s Ratnakaraņdaka śrāvakācāra:

1.Ahimsa
The first vow of a Digambara monk relates to the observance of ahiṃsā (non-injury). The monk is required to renounce himsa (injury) in all three forms:
Kŗita- He shouldn't commit any act of himsa (injury) himself.
Karita- He shouldn't ask anyone else to do it for him.
Anumodana- He shouldn't, in any way, encourage commission of an act of himsa by saying or doing anything subsequent to the act.

There were five types of Ahinsa as per scriptures. These are the negation of following: Binding, beating, mutilating limbs, overloading, withholding food and drink. However over the centuries, Jain monks and philosophers have added stricter meanings and implementations. The concept of Ahinsa is specially well expanded and made diverse in the scriptures dating afterwards 10th century AD.

The monk shouldn't injure any living being both in actions and thoughts.

2.Truth
A digambara monk must not say things which, though true, can lead to injury to living beings.

3. Asteya (Non-thieving)
Not to take anything if not given. According to the Jain text, Tattvārthasūtra, five observances that strengthen this vow are:
Residence in a solitary place
Residence in a deserted habitation
Causing no hindrance to others,
Acceptance of clean food, and
Not quarrelling with brother monks.

4. Brahmacharya
Brahmacharya refers to the self-control in respect of sex-function. It means avoiding all the kinds of natural and unnatural sex-gratification.

5. Aparigraha
Renunciation of worldly things and foreign natures, external and internal

Fivefold regulation of activities

6. irya samiti
A digambara monk doesn't move about in the dark, nor on grass, but only along a path which is much trodden by foot. While moving, he has to observe the ground in front of him, to the extent of four cubits (2 yards), so as to avoid treading over any living being. This samiti (control) is transgressed by:
not being careful enough in looking at the ground in front, and 
sight-seeing along the route.
7. bhasha samiti
Not to criticise anyone or speak bad words.
8. 
The food should be free from four kinds of afflictions to tarasa jīva (living beings possessing two or more senses), viz 
pain or trouble,
cutting, piercing etc.,
distress, or mental suffering, and 
destruction or killing,
9. adan-nishep
To be careful in lifting and laying down things.
10. pratişthāpanā
To dispose of the body waste at a place free from living beings.

Strict control on five senses
11-16.Panchindrinirodh
This means renouncing all things which appeals to the mind through the senses. This means shedding all attachment and aversion towards the sense-objects pertaining to touch (sparśana), taste (rasana), smell (ghrāņa), sight (chakşu), and hearing (śrotra).

Six Essential Duties 
16.Samayika (Equanimous dispassion)

The monk is required to spend about six  (a ghari = 24 minutes) three times a day, that is, morning, noon, and evening, in practising equanimous dispassion.
17. stuti 
Worship of the four and twenty Tirthankaras
18. vandan
To pay obeisances to siddhas, arihantas and acharya
19. Pratikramana
Self-censure, repentance; to drive oneself away from the multitude of karmas, virtuous or wicked, done in the past.
20. Pratikhayan- Renunciation
21. Kayotsarga
Giving up attachment to the body and meditate on soul. (Posture: rigid and immobile, with arms held stiffly down, knees straight, and toes directly forward)

Seven rules or restrictions (niyama) 
22. 
Not to use tooth powder to clean teeth
23. 
To rest only on earth or wooden pallet.
24. Asnāna
Non-bathing- A digambara monk doesn't take baths. In his book "Sannyāsa Dharma", Champat Rai Jain writes:
25. ekasthiti-bhojana
Taking food in a steady, standing posture.
26. 
The monk consume food & water once in a day. He accepts pure food free from forty-six faults (doşa), thirty-two obstructions (antarāya), and fourteen contaminations (maladoşa).
27. Keśa-lonch
To pluck hair on the head and face by hand.
28. nāgnya
To renounce clothes.

Dharma 
According to Jain texts, the dharma (conduct) of a monk is tenfold, comprising ten excellencies or virtues.
Forbearance: The absence of defilement such as anger in the ascetic, who goes out for food for preserving the body, when he meets with insolent words, ridicule or derision, disgrace, bodily torment and so on from vicious people.
Modesty (humility): Absence of arrogance or egotism on account of high birth, rank and so on.
Straightforwardness: Behaviour free from crookedness.
Purity: Freedom from greed.
Truth: Using chaste words in the presence of noble persons.
Self-restraint: Desisting from injury to life-principles and sensual pleasures while engaged in careful activity.
Supreme austerity: Undergoing penance in order to destroy the accumulated karmas is austerity. Austerity is of twelve kinds.
Gift- Giving or bestowing knowledge etc. appropriate to saints.
Non-attachment: giving up adornment of the body and the thought ‘this is mine’.
Perfect celibacy: It consists in not recalling pleasure enjoyed previously, not listening to stories of sexual passion (renouncing erotic literature), and renouncing bedding and seats used by women.

The word ‘perfect’ or ‘supreme’ is added to every one of the terms in order to indicate the avoidance of temporal objectives.

Twenty-two afflictions 
Jain texts list down twenty-two hardships (parīşaha jaya) that should be endured by an ascetic who wish to attain moksha (liberation). These are required to be endured without any anguish.
kşudhā – hunger;
trişā – thirst;
śīta – cold;
uşņa – heat;
dañśamaśaka – insect-bite;
nāgnya – nakedness;
arati – displeasure;
strī – disturbance due to feminine attraction;
caryā – discomfort arising from roaming;
nişadhyā – discomfort of postures;
śayyā – uncomfortable couch;
ākrośa – scolding, insult;
vadha – assault, injury;
yācanā – determination not to beg for favours;
alābha – lack of gain; not getting food for several days in several homes;
roga – illness;
traņasparśa – pain inflicted by blades of grass;
mala – dirt of the body;
satkāra-puraskāra – (absence of) reverence and honour;
prajñā – (conceit of) learning;
ajñāna – despair or uneasiness arising from failure to acquire knowledge;
adarśana – disbelief due to delay in the fruition of meritorious deeds.

External austerities 
According to the Jain text, Sarvārthasiddhi, "Affliction is what occurs by chance. Mortification is self-imposed. These are called external, because these are dependent on external things and these are seen by others."

Several Jain texts including Tattvarthsutra mentions the six external austerities that can be performed:
'Fasting' to promote self-control and discipline, destruction of attachment.
'Diminished diet' is intended to develop vigilance in self-control, suppression of evils, contentment and study with ease.
'Special restrictions' consist in limiting the number of houses etc. for begging food, and these are intended for overcoming desire.
The fourth is 'giving up stimulating and delicious food' such as ghee, in order to curb the excitement caused by the senses, overcome sleep, and facilitate study.
lonely habitation- The ascetic has to 'make his abode in lonely places' or houses, which are free from insect afflictions, in order to maintain without disturbance celibacy, study, meditation and so on. 
Standing in the sun, dwelling under trees, sleeping in an open place without any covering, the different postures – all these constitute the sixth austerity, namely 'mortification of the body'.

Jain monks and advanced laypeople avoid eating after sunset, observing a vow of ratri-bhojana-tyaga-vrata. Digambara monks observe a stricter vow by eating only once a day.

Āchārya 

Āchārya means the Chief Preceptor or the Head. Āchārya has thirty-six primary attributes (mūla guņa) consisting in:
Twelve kinds of austerities (tapas);
Ten virtues (dasa-lakşaņa dharma);
Five kinds of observances in regard to faith, knowledge, conduct, austerities, and power. These are:
Darśanācāra- Believing that the pure Self is the only object belonging to the self and all other objects, including the karmic matter ( and no-karma) are alien; further, believing in the six substances, seven Realities (tattvas) and veneration of Jina, Teachers, and the Scripture, is the observance in regard to faith (darśanā).
Jñānācāra- Reckoning that the pure Self has no delusion, is distinct from attachment and aversion, knowledge itself, and sticking to this notion always is the observance in regard to knowledge (jñānā).
Cāritrācāra- Being free from attachment etc. is right conduct which gets obstructed by passions. In view of this, getting always engrossed in the pure Self, free from all corrupting dispositions, is the observance in regard to conduct (cāritrā).
Tapācāra- Performance of different kinds of austerities is essential to spiritual advancement. Performance of penances with due control of senses and desires constitutes the observance in regard to austerities (tapā).
Vīryācāra- Carrying out the above-mentioned four observances with full vigour and intensity, without digression and concealment of true strength, constitutes the observance in regard to power (vīryā).
Six essential duties (Şadāvaśyaka); and
Gupti- Controlling the threefold activity of:
the body;
the organ of speech; and
the mind.

See also 

 Ethics of Jainism
 List of Digambar Jain ascetics

Notes

References

Sources

External links

 
Monasticism